The military career of Muhammad (c. 570 – 8 June 632), the Islamic prophet, encompasses several expeditions and battles throughout the Hejaz region in the western Arabian Peninsula which took place in the final ten years of his life, from 622 to 632. His primary campaign was against his own tribe in Mecca, the Quraysh. Muhammad proclaimed prophethood around 610 and later migrated to Medina after being persecuted by the Quraysh in 622. After several battles against the Quraysh, Muhammad conquered Mecca in 629, ending his campaign against the tribe.

Alongside his campaign against the Quraysh, Muhammad led campaigns against several other tribes of Arabia, most notably the three Arabian Jewish tribes of Medina and the Jewish fortress at Khaybar. He expelled the Banu Qaynuqa tribe for violating the Constitution of Medina in 624, followed by the Banu Nadir who were expelled in May 625 after being accused of plotting to assassinate him. Finally, in 628, he besieged and invaded the Jewish fortress of Khaybar, which hosted more than 10,000 Jews, which Muslim sources say was retaliation for planning to ally themselves with the local Arab pagan tribes.In the final years of his life, Muhammad sent several armies against the Byzantine Empire and the Ghassanids in northern Arabia and the Levant, before conquering Mecca in 630 and leading a campaign against some Arab pagan tribes close to Mecca, most notably in Ta'if. The last army led by Muhammad before his death was in the Battle of Tabuk in October 630. By his death in 632, Muhammad had managed to unite most of the Arabian Peninsula, laying the foundation for the subsequent Islamic expansion under the caliphates and defining Islamic military jurisprudence.

Background

Muhammad's role in The Sacrilegious Wars

In his prophetic biography titled The Sealed Nectar, Safiur Rahman Mubarakpuri cites Ibn Hisham in saying that Muhammad took part in the Sacrilegious Wars, which took place between an alliance of the Quraysh and the Kinanah and the Qais 'Ailan, when he was 15, saying that "his efforts were confined to picking up the arrows of the enemy as they fell, and handing them over to his uncles."

Situation in Medina
Medina was divided into five tribes: two of them the Khazraj and Aws, while the Jews were represented by, from smallest to largest, the Banu Qaynuqa, Banu Nadir and Banu Quraizah. Upon his arrival in Medina, Muhammad set about the establishment of a pact known as the Constitution of Medina, to regulate the matters of governance of the city, as well as the extent and nature of inter-community relations, and signatories to it included the Muhajirun, the Ansar and the Jewish tribes of Medina. Significant clauses of the constitution included the mutual assistance of each other if one signatory were to be attacked by a third party, the resolution that the Muslims would profess their religion and the Jews theirs, as well as the appointment of Muhammad as the leader of the state.

And the threat to the life of both the Ansar and the Muhajireen was such that they were reported as having to sleep by their weapons all night. As tensions escalated the Muslims began to take defensive measures such as stationing guards around Muhammad and sending out reconnaissance patrols.

After initially refusing to accede to requests by his followers to fight the Meccans for continued persecution and provocation, he eventually proclaimed the revelations of the Quran:
"Permission to fight is given to those who are fought against because they have been wronged -truly Allah has the power to come to their support- those who were expelled from their homes without any right, merely for saying, 'Our Lord is Allah'...""-Surah 22:39–40

History

Campaign against the Jews of Medina

Expulsion of the Banu Qaynuqa'

In April 624, after the Battle of Badr, the Banu Qaynuqa violated the Constitution of Medina by shaming a Muslim woman by pinning and tearing her clothes. A Muslim man who witnessed this, killed the Jewish man responsible for it in retaliation. The Jews came in group against the Muslim and killed him. After a successive chain of similar revenge killings, enmity grew between Muslims and the Banu Qaynuqa', which led Muhammad to lay siege to their fortress. The Qaynuqa' had a strength of around 700. After being besieged for 14–15 days, the tribe eventually surrendered to Muhammad, who initially wanted to capture the men of Banu Qaynuqa', but ultimately yielded to Abdullah ibn 'Ubayy and agreed to expel the Qaynuqa'. The tribe eventually went northward toward Der'aa in modern-day Syria and assimilated themselves into the local Jewish population.

Expulsion of the Banu Nadir

In May 625, Muhammad laid siege to the Banu Nadir, after he came to know that they were plotting to assassinate him. The siege is said to have lasted anywhere between six and fifteen days. Enjoying their strategic advantage due to the thick foliage of palm trees surrounding their castles, the Banu Nadir pelted the Muslims with stones and showered arrows upon them from their castles. In response, Muhammad is said to have commanded the burning of the palm trees. The tribe eventually surrendered and was expelled, moving northward toward Khaybar, another Jewish fort city around 150 km (95 mi) north of Medina and was captured again during the Battle of Khaybar. They were allowed to live around Khaybar until the Rashidun caliph, 'Umar ibn al-Khattab, expelled them for a second time.

Invasion of the Banu Qurayza

During the Battle of the Trench in December 626 and January 627, the Jewish tribe of Banu Qurayza, whose forts were located in southern Medina, were caught conspiring to ally themselves with the confederates and were charged with treachery. After the retreat of the coalition, Muslims besieged their forts, and they were the last of the Jewish tribes of Medina. The Banu Qurayza surrendered and all the men and one woman were beheaded, apart from a few who converted to Islam, while all the other women and children were enslaved.

In dealing with Muhammad's treatment of the Jews of Medina, aside from political explanations, western historians and biographers have explained it as "the punishment of the Medinan Jews, who were invited to convert and refused, perfectly exemplify the Quran's tales of what happened to those who rejected the prophets of old." Francis Edward Peters adds that Muhammad was possibly emboldened by his military successes and also wanted to push his advantage. Economical motivations, according to Peters, also existed since the poorness of the Meccan migrants was a source of concern for Muhammad. Peters argues that Muhammad's treatment of the Jews of Medina was "quite extraordinary" and is "quite at odds with Muhammad's treatment of the Jews he encountered outside Medina."

According to Welch, Muhammad's treatment of the three major Jewish tribes brought Muhammad closer to his goal of organizing a community strictly on a religious basis.

Siege of Khaybar

In March 628, according to Muslims sources, the Jews of Khaybar, along with the Banu Nadir, who were exiled from Medina by Muhammad for violating the Constitution of Medina, and the Banu Ghatafan, were planning to attack the Muslims. When Muhammad learned of their alliance, he gathered an army of 1,500 soldiers and besieged the Jewish fortress at Khaybar. Scottish historian and orientalist, William Montgomery Watt agrees with this view. Italian orientalist Laura Veccia Vaglieri claims other motives pushed Muhammad to invade the forts of Khaybar.

On the other side, the Banu Ghatafan were afraid that the Muslims would attack them at any time, so they refused to help the Jews at Khaybar. After capturing six of the eight Jewish forts in Medina, the Jews of Khaybar finally surrendered and were allowed to live in the oasis on the condition that they would give one-half of their produce to the Muslims. Two Jewish commanders were killed in the siege.

They continued to live in the oasis for several more years until they were expelled by caliph 'Umar ibn al-Khattab. The imposition of tribute upon the conquered Jews served as a precedent for provisions in the Islamic law for the jizya.

Byzantine campaign
In the final years of his life, after suppressing the two main factions that were leading in the opposition against him; the Meccans and the Jews, Muhammad led an active campaign against the main force in the north, the Byzantine Empire, which was involved in several wars against the Sasanian Empire, known as the Roman–Persian Wars.

Following a defeat in the Battle of Mu'tah in Muhammad's campaign against the Byzantine began with the final expedition led by Muhammad himself, the Tabuk expedition, which is also known as the Usra expedition. Muhammad heard of the gathering of a large Byzantine–Ghassanid alliance against the Muslims in Tabuk and led a force of some 30,000 men to look for them. After waiting and scouting for the enemy for twenty days, Muhammad returned to Medina.

Statistics
The number of all casualties on all sides, in all the battles of Muhammad, is approximately 1,000. A contemporary Islamic scholar, Maulana Wahiduddin Khan, says that "during the 23-years in which this revolution was completed, 80 military expeditions took place. Fewer than 20 expeditions actually involved any fighting. 259 Muslims and 759 non-Muslims died in these battles – a total of 1018 dead."
Most of those killed were men from the Banu Qurayza tribe after they surrendered to a siege as an aftermath of the Invasion of Banu Qurayza.

Legacy
Javed Ahmed Ghamidi writes in Mizan that there are certain directives of the Qur’an pertaining to war which were specific only to Muhammad against divinely-specified peoples of his times (the polytheists and the Israelites and Nazarites of Arabia and some other Jews, Christians, et al.) as a form of divine punishment—for they had persistently denied the truth of Muhammad's mission even after it had been made conclusively evident to them by Allah through Muhammad, and asked the polytheists of Arabia for submission to Islam as a condition for exoneration and the others for jizya and submission to the political authority of the Muslims for military protection as the dhimmis of the Muslims. Therefore, after Muhammad and his companions, there is no concept in Islam obliging Muslims to wage war for propagation or implementation of Islam, hence now, the only valid reason for war is to end oppression when all other measures have failed or, jihad.

See also
 Rules of war in Islam
 Jihad
 List of expeditions of Muhammad
 Itmaam-i-hujjat
 Muslim conquests

References

Further reading

 
 
 Joel Hayward (2012). Warfare in the Qur'an English Monograph Series – Book No. 14. Royal Islamic Strategic Studies Centre, Amman, Jordan. . 
 Joel Hayward (2017). "War is Deceit": An Analysis of a Contentious Hadith on the Morality of Military Deception.  English Monograph Series – Book No. 24. Royal Islamic Strategic Studies Centre, Amman, Jordan. .
 Joel Hayward (2018). Civilian Immunity in Foundational Islamic Strategic Thought: A Historical Enquiry.  English Monograph Series – Book No. 25. Royal Islamic Strategic Studies Centre, Amman, Jordan. .
 
 

Muhammad
Battles of Muhammad